

Herbert-Ernst Vahl was a German SS functionary during the Nazi era. In World War II, he commanded the SS Division Das Reich and the SS Polizei Division. He was a recipient of the Knight's Cross of the Iron Cross of Nazi Germany.

In February 1943, Vahl was promoted to Oberführer, and given command of the SS Division Das Reich which was stationed in the Soviet Union. While in command during the Third Battle of Kharkov he was seriously wounded and awarded the Knight's Cross of the Iron Cross. After recovering from his wounds he became the Inspector of Panzer troops in the SS Führungshauptamt (SS Leadership Main Office). In July 1944 Vahl returned to active service with the SS Polizei Division which was stationed in Thessalonika, Greece. Vahl arrived to assume command of the Division on 13 July 1944 but was killed in an auto accident on 22 July 1944.

References

Citations

Bibliography

 

Recipients of the Knight's Cross of the Iron Cross
Recipients of the Gold German Cross
German Army personnel of World War I
SS-Brigadeführer
1944 deaths
Military personnel from Poznań
People from the Province of Posen
1896 births
Road incident deaths in Greece
Prussian Army personnel
Waffen-SS personnel killed in action